Bellastraea is a genus of sea snails, marine gastropod mollusks in the family Turbinidae, the turban snails.

The Australian Faunal Directory considers this genus as a synonym of Astralium Link, 1807

Species
Species within the genus Bellastraea include:

 Bellastraea aurea (Jonas, 1844)
 Bellastraea rutidoloma (Tate, 1893)
 Bellastraea squamifera (Koch, 1844)
Species brought into synonymy
 Astraea kesteveni T. Iredale, 1924: synonym of Bellastraea squamifera (Koch, 1844)
 Bellastraea kesteveni (Iredale, 1924): synonym of Bellastraea squamifera (Koch, 1844)
 Bellastraea urvillei Philippi, R.A., 1852: synonym of Astralium tentoriiforme (Jonas, J.H., 1845)

References

 Iredale, 1924,  Proceedings of the Linnean Society of New South Wales, 49(3): 182, 232
 Williams, S.T. (2007). Origins and diversification of Indo-West Pacific marine fauna: evolutionary history and biogeography of turban shells (Gastropoda, Turbinidae). Biological Journal of the Linnean Society, 2007, 92, 573–592.
 Alf A. & Kreipl K. (2011) The family Turbinidae. Subfamilies Turbininae Rafinesque, 1815 and Prisogasterinae Hickman & McLean, 1990. In: G.T. Poppe & K. Groh (eds), A Conchological Iconography. Hackenheim: Conchbooks. pp. 1–82, pls 104-245

 
Turbinidae
Gastropod genera